International Community School of Abidjan (ICSA) is an English-speaking international school in Riviera III, Abidjan, Ivory Coast.

The school serves levels Kindergarten through Grade 12. The International Community School of Abidjan Association operates the school, while the U.S. Embassy in Côte d'Ivoire sponsors it and the U.S. State Department Office of Overseas Schools provides support. The Middle States Association and the Council of International Schools accredit the school.

History
Several Americans, all of whom related in some way to the U.S. Embassy, established the school in 1972 with 12 initial students. The school moved into its current campus in 1989. Both the First Ivorian Civil War of 2002–2007 and the Second Ivorian Civil War of 2010–2011 disrupted the school and caused its student population to decline. The school occupied a temporary campus near M’Pouto in 2005, during the course of the first war. After each war ended, the student body recovered.

See also

 Education in Ivory Coast
 Ivory Coast–United States relations
 List of international schools

References

External links
 , the school's official website

1972 establishments in Ivory Coast
Abidjan
Educational institutions established in 1972
Elementary and primary schools in Ivory Coast
International high schools
International schools in Ivory Coast
Ivory Coast–United States relations
Schools in Abidjan
High schools and secondary schools in Ivory Coast